William McKinley Lowe (July 27, 1900 – November 19, 1988), nicknamed "Kid", was an American Negro league third baseman who played from 1921 to 1931 for the Indianapolis ABCs, Detroit Stars, Memphis Red Sox, and Nashville Elite Giants.

A native of Mobile, Alabama, Lowe coached baseball at Booker T. Washington High School after his playing career had ended. In 1937, he formed his own semi-pro barnstorming team, which featured such notable players as Verdell Mathis.

Lowe died in Memphis, Tennessee in 1988 at age 88.

References

External links
 and Seamheads

1900 births
1988 deaths
Detroit Stars players
Indianapolis ABCs players
Memphis Red Sox players
Nashville Elite Giants players
Baseball third basemen
Sportspeople from Mobile, Alabama
Baseball players from Alabama
20th-century African-American sportspeople